This list of tallest buildings in Toledo, Ohio ranks by height the high-rise buildings in the U.S. city of Toledo, Ohio. Toledo contains 21 high rise buildings of at least 50 meters (164 ft.) in height, with a further 10 buildings between 35 meters (115 ft.) and 50 meters in height. 

The tallest structure in Toledo, Ohio is the Cleveland-Cliffs HBI Furnace Tower, which is an industrial vertical shaft furnace reaching a height of 139 meters (457 ft.) and is not designed for continuous residential or commercial occupancy. The 2nd tallest structure, and tallest occupied commercial building, is the 32-story, 125 meter (411 ft.) Fifth Third Center at One SeaGate on the downtown riverfront. The third tallest structure, and tallest residential building, is the Tower on the Maumee at 122 meters (400 ft.).

Tallest buildings
These are Toledo's buildings with an architectural height of more than 35 meters (115 feet):

Tallest destroyed or demolished
This table lists buildings in Toledo that were destroyed or demolished and at one time stood at least  in height.

Timeline of tallest buildings

This lists buildings that once held the title of tallest in Toledo.

References

Buildings and structures in Toledo, Ohio
Toledo, Ohio

Tallest in Toledo